Acolium is a genus of lichenized fungi in the family Caliciaceae. The genus has a widespread distribution and contains five species.

Species
Acolium chloroconium 
Acolium inquinans 
Acolium karelicum 
Acolium marcianum 
Acolium sessile

References

Caliciales
Lichen genera
Taxa named by Erik Acharius
Caliciales genera
Taxa described in 1808